Valentina Kamsulyeva (born 2 March 1971) is a Kazakhstani former judoka. She competed in the women's half-middleweight event at the 1996 Summer Olympics.

References

External links
 

1971 births
Living people
Kazakhstani female judoka
Olympic judoka of Kazakhstan
Judoka at the 1996 Summer Olympics
Place of birth missing (living people)
20th-century Kazakhstani women
21st-century Kazakhstani women